Cado Belle were a Scottish rock group prominent in the pub rock scene of the mid-1970s, and are notable for making the first recordings featuring singer Maggie Reilly who went on to have success with Mike Oldfield and as a solo artist. Band member Colin Tully achieved some fame with the soundtrack of the critically acclaimed film,  Gregory's Girl. Their genre has also been described as Scottish soul.

Origins
In Glasgow, singer Maggie Reilly met Stuart MacKillop who asked her to join his band Joe Cool. In October 1974 the band merged with another called Up, forming Cado Belle.  They issued their only, self-titled album in autumn 1976. It was followed a year later by an EP. They continued to gig in 1978 but dissolved the following year.

Line-up
Maggie Reilly: Vocals, backing vocals
Alan Darby: Guitars
Gavin Hodgson: Bass
Stuart MacKillop: Keyboards
Davy Roy: Drums, percussion
Colin Tully: Saxophone, flute, horn arrangements

Recordings
Their only LP, titled simply Cado Belle, was released in 1976 on the Anchor Records label. The track listing is as follows:

 "All Too Familiar" 3:09 (Stuart MacKillop / Alasdair Robertson)
 "Infamous Mister" 3:49 (Stuart MacKillop / Alasdair Robertson)
 "Rocked to Stony Silence" 5:26 (Colin Tully / Alasdair Robertson)
 "I Name This Ship Survival" 4:31 (Colin Tully / Alasdair Robertson)
 "Paper in the Rain" 3:55 (Stuart MacKillop / Alasdair Robertson)
 "That Kind of Fool" 3:52 (Stuart MacKillop / Alasdair Robertson)
 "Airport Shutdown" 3:39 (Colin Tully / Alasdair Robertson)
 "Rough Diamonds2 4:49 (Stuart MacKillop / Alasdair Robertson)
 "Got to Love" 2:45 (Stuart MacKillop)
 "Stone's Throw from Nowhere" 4:55 (Colin Tully / Alasdair Robertson)

Mel Collins, Frank Collins and Paddie McHugh from the band Kokomo guested on the album.

In 1977, they recorded the Cado Belle EP, containing the following tracks:
 "It's Over" (Boz Scaggs/David Paich)
 "September" (Alan Darby)
 "Play It Once for Me" (Stuart MacKillop)
 "Gimme Little Sign" (Alfred Smith/Joe Hooven/Hal Winn)

A CD containing all fourteen tracks from the album and the EP was released by Mirror Image Records in 2008.

References

British pub rock music groups
Musical groups established in 1974
Musical groups disestablished in 1979